Metrius contractus is a species of bombardier beetle. It was described by Johann Friedrich von Eschscholtz in 1829.

References

External links
 

Paussinae
Beetles of North America
Beetles described in 1829
Taxa named by Johann Friedrich von Eschscholtz